Hemeroplanes is a genus of moths in the family Sphingidae.

Species
Hemeroplanes diffusa Rothschild & Jordan, 1903
Hemeroplanes longistriga Rothschild & Jordan, 1903
Hemeroplanes ornatus Rothschild, 1894
Hemeroplanes triptolemus (Cramer, 1779)

Dilophonotini
Moth genera
Taxa named by Jacob Hübner